Franklin is a Canadian municipality located in the Montérégie region of Quebec along the Canada–US border. The population as of the Canada 2011 Census was 1,688.

Geography
The municipality is situated along the border with the United States.

Geological features include an east-west forested ridge Covey Hill, a foothill to the northern Adirondack Mountains of New York State, from which the skyscrapers of Montreal are visible to the northeast. Streams run from its northern flank to the Chateauguay Valley where tributaries feed the Chateauguay River that drains into the St. Lawrence River.

Communities
The following locations reside within the municipality's boundaries:
Dorea – a hamlet situated in the southern portion.
Franklin Centre – a hamlet located at the junction of Route 202 and Route 209. Named for Arctic explorer John Franklin.
Saint-Antoine-Abbé – a village located along Quebec Route 209.

Demographics

Population

Language

Economy
Apple orchards and maple sugar groves are the principal agriculture near the village of Franklin Centre, Quebec and on the hill while around the village of St. Antoine Abbe in the flat valley there are fertile croplands and dairy farms.

Leahy Orchards is a major employer and exporter of applesauce and Applesnax label products.

Attractions
"Chemin de Covey Hill" (Covey Hill road) is considered to be one of the premier cycling roads in southern Quebec. This is due to the impressive climb between Havelock and Franklin Centre, the breath-taking views of the St. Lawrence and Richelieu river valleys, as well as a surprisingly good quality road surface. This is the first road north of the US-Canada border.

See also
 List of municipalities in Quebec

References

External links
Official website Retrieved 20 April 2020.
 Chateauguay Valley
 Visitors guide to u-pick apples

Municipalities in Quebec
Incorporated places in Le Haut-Saint-Laurent Regional County Municipality